Skyline High School is a public high school in Longmont, Colorado, United States. It is part of the St. Vrain Valley School District. Current enrollment at the school is approximately 1260 students, in grades 9-12. The school mascot is the Falcon, and the school colors are red and yellow.

Notable alumni

 J. J. Raterink, Arena Football League player.
 Kristen Schaal, actress and comedian
 JD Smith (born Joshua Seefried), founder of OutServe

References

Public high schools in Colorado
Schools in Boulder County, Colorado
Longmont, Colorado
Educational institutions established in 1978